Gong Xian (simplified Chinese: 龚贤; traditional Chinese: 龔賢; pinyin: Gōng Xián; Wade–Giles: Kung Hsien) (1618–1689; the specific year of birth is disputed as early as 1617 or as late as 1620; born in Kunshan, Jiangsu) was a Chinese painter in the late Ming and early Qing Dynasties, one of the Eight Masters of Nanjing (Jinling) and the leading painter of the Nanjing school.

He was also known as Qixian(), Banqian(), Banmu() and Yeyi(); Chaizhangren() and Zhongshanyelao(). He enjoyed equal popularity with the poet and calligrapher Lu Qian in the early Qing Dynasty. They were called "Two Ban of the World", (Gong Xian: Banqian; Lu Qian, Banyin).

Artistic career 
Primarily a landscape painter, mountains were the subject of most of Gong Xian's paintings. Willows are also a common theme in his work.

Gong Xian was a scholar loyal to the fallen Ming Dynasty. In the early years, he participated in the reunification activities. During the war in the late Ming Dynasty, he was forced to flee to save his life and drifted away. He spent many years at Yangzhou in exile, during which he continued to author anti-Qing works, and develop his characteristic "light Gong" and "dark Gong" styles.

Gong Xian was also one of the literati and known for his work with prose and poetry. It was only after the fall of Nanjing to the Qing that he took up professional painting as his primary means of making a living. However, despite painting several great pieces over his life, he ultimately died as he lived, in poverty.

Notable Works

Painting 

 Landscapes and trees
 Landscapes of the Twelve Months
 Dwelling among Mountains and Clouds
 Landscapes with Poems
 Landscapes with Poems

Poetry 

 Plane
 Drinking in Xu's Garden
 Swallows to go east

Literary Works 

 Caoxiangtang Collection
 Painting Technique
 Chai Zhangren's Draft
 Gong Banqian's Paintings
 Poetry Meeting
 Banmu Garden Poetry Grass
 Banmu Garden Pond
 Midnight Tang Shi Ji

Character Memorial 

The word "Qingliangshan" on the stone plaque in the middle of the gate of Soyelou was written by Gong Xian. The Memorial Hall was built on the southwest side of Qingliang Mountain. Regarding the origin of the name of the Saoye Tower, there are historical records in the Qianlong period of the Qing Dynasty. Gong Xian once made a self-portrait. In this painting, he turned into a monk who was sweeping leaves, which was named the Saoye Tower. The building was destroyed by fire in the Qing Dynasty. In 1889, at the edict of Emperor Guangxu, the building was rebuilt, and it was rebuilt twice in 1901 and 1914.

External links
 Gong Xian at the Cleveland Museum of Art
 Gong Xian at the Hong Kong Museum of Art
 Gong Xian at the Kimbell Art Museum in Fort Worth
 Gong Xian at the Metropolitan Museum of Art in New York City

References 

Ming dynasty landscape painters
Qing dynasty landscape painters
Painters from Suzhou
Ming dynasty calligraphers
Ming dynasty poets
Writers from Suzhou
Poets from Jiangsu
17th-century Chinese calligraphers